Poynting may refer to:

 John Henry Poynting (1852–1914), a British physicist, after whom are named:
 Poynting vector, a representation of the energy flux of an electromagnetic field 
 Poynting's theorem on conservation of energy in electromagnetic field 
 Poynting (lunar crater), crater on the Moon
 Poynting (Martian crater), crater on Mars
 11063 Poynting, a main-belt asteroid